Callichroma minimum is a species of beetle in the family Cerambycidae. It was described by Podany in 1965. It is known from Nicaragua.

References

Callichromatini
Beetles described in 1965